The Newtown Jets are an Australian rugby league football club based in Newtown, a suburb of Sydney's inner west. They currently compete in the NSW Cup competition, having left the top grade after the 1983 NSWRFL season. The Jets' home ground is Henson Park, and their team colours are blue (traditionally royal blue) and white.

Established in 1908, Newtown were one of the founding members of the New South Wales Rugby Football League. They competed continuously in the NSWRFL premiership until their departure in 1983, the first reduction in the League since 1937. Over this period they won the competition three times.

History

NSWRFL Premiership
The club was founded on 14 January 1908 at a public meeting held at Newtown Town Hall that had been convened by the prominent Sydney sportsman James J. Giltinan (after whom the NSW Rugby League Premiership shield is named), local MP Henry Hoyle, and Harry Hamill (1879-1947), who was to be the fledgling club's first captain.

Newtown was the second rugby league football club to be founded in Australia and is the oldest in existence. The first club, Glebe, was formed on 9 January 1908. When the 'Dirty Reds' (Glebe) were controversially excluded from the NSWRL Premiership in 1929, Newtown became the oldest remaining Australian club.

There is some discussion however over whether or not Newtown was actually the first Rugby league club in Australia, being formed on 8 January 1908, one day earlier than Glebe. The club's website stands by this claim, however other sources, most notably Terry Williams' book Out of the Blue: The History of Newtown RLFC, dispute this claim.  Rugby league historian Sean Fagan similarly holds that the date of 14 January 1908 is the correct foundation day. The minutes of the original meeting held by Newtown's Board shows the date as 8 January.

Newtown played in the NSWRFL Premiership from 1908 to 1983. They won the 1910 NSWRFL Premiership after drawing the final was enough to see them win due to being minor premiers. A Newtown winger, Jack Scott, was the first to score a try in the New South Wales Rugby League premiership.

Known as the "Newtown Bluebags" for most of its lifetime, the club adopted the Jets nickname in 1973, perhaps referring to Newtown's catchment area extending to Sydney Airport. Or perhaps due to the close proximity of the club's home ground, Henson Park, to the major north–south flight path for the airport.

Jack Gibson took over as Newtown coach in 1973. Gibson picked his team solely on form, irrespective of seniority. The great Brian Moore had been relegated to the reserves bench throughout the preliminary rounds of the Wills Cup tournament, and youngsters like Ian Satori, Dennis Gardiner, Peter Parry and Warren Snodgrass were all given a chance in the top grade. The Newtown side for the final was:

Barry Cox, Mark Cohen, Dave Oliveri, John Bonham, John Bradstock, Ken Wilson, Des O'Connor (c), Neil Pringle, Gary Sullivan, Peter Parry, Tom Melville, Mark Robertson and Dennis Gardiner.

The St. George lineup was:

Graeme Langlands, Geoff Carr, Ted Goodwin, Bob Clapham, John Chapman, Tony Branson, M. Shulman, Lindsay Drake, Peter Fitzgerald, Rod Reddy, Inisai Toga, Colin Rasmussen, and Harry Eden.

The Wills Cup Final was played under floodlights at the old Sydney Sports Ground on St Patricks day before a crowd of 13,180. At halftime St. George were up 15-2 and looked certain to win. In the second half the Newtown forward pack gave the Saints a taste of their own medicine which helped gain tries for Melville and Robertson, both converted by Ken Wilson which reduced the St George lead to 15–12. Brian Moore brought on at halftime, scored the final try, converted by Ken Wilson which sealed victory for Newtown in the last minute, making the game one of the most exciting comeback wins in rugby league history.

After Gibson departed the Newtown side as head coach, the club went through another period of decline and finished last in the 1976, 1977 and 1978 seasons.  In 1979, the club appointed Warren Ryan as head coach who turned the club's fortunes around again once more.

The 1981 Newtown team, which played in the club's last NSWRL premiership grand final, included the legends of game Tommy Raudonikis and Phil Gould. It was coached by Warren Ryan. Newtown had led the match 7–6 at halftime against Parramatta but were defeated 20–11 at the Sydney Cricket Ground.

Ejection from the Premiership
Along with financial pressures and pressure put on by the South Sydney Rabbitohs to expel the club, the club was forced out of the NSWRL Premiership at the end of 1983. The club continued to seek readmission, pursuing various different alternatives.  One such alternative, proposed for the 1985 season (after a planned one-year sojourn from the League) involved a full relocation to Orana Park, at Campbelltown in south/west Sydney, and during this period the club was being run by their loyal stalwart and CEO, Frank Farrington.

This plan involved a name change for the club, to the Newtown-Campbelltown Jets.  The proposal, including a new logo with the new name on the traditional royal blue jersey, was approved by the football club directors. In the end these plans fell through, as the economic recession of the early 1980s prevented the club from finding a suitable buyer of the Newtown Leagues Club, on Stanmore Road, Stanmore.

This left the Newtown club out of the premier Australian Rugby league competitions.  In 1988, Newtown were able to sell their clubhouse, now the Cyprus Community Club of NSW, but by then time had elapsed and readmission to the top competition was not considered.

It is worth noting, however, that for a short time in their final season of 1983, Newtown called Campbelltown home. As a show of commitment to the Campbelltown-Liverpool area, with a new junior league structure ready to be implemented at the Jets' instigation for the 1984 season, Newtown played six home games of the club's final season, at Orana Park in Campbelltown, including an opening round blockbuster against 1981-82 premiers Parramatta Eels, won 54-14 by a rampant Eels combination. On August 27 Newtown played their last match, defeating Canberra 9–6.

Ultimately, when the final deal between Newtown and the Campbelltown-Liverpool junior rugby league fell through in 1984 and it was confirmed by 1985 that Newtown would not be returning to top flight competition, the Ashfield/Lidcombe-based Western Suburbs Magpies, suspended by the League at the same time as Newtown but having had the financial resources to earn a stay of execution, negotiated a deal for the 1987 season whereby Wests would move all home games to Campbelltown and claim ownership of the vast junior league in south-western Sydney.

Newtown District Junior Rugby League
The Newtown District Junior Rugby League (NDJRL) competition ended after the ejection of the club from the NSWRL premiership in 1983. The NDJRL was absorbed mainly into the South Sydney District Junior Rugby Football League and also a small part into the St George and Canterbury-Bankstown districts. Existing junior clubs that were formerly part of the Newtown district include the Camperdown Dragons (now in South Sydney), Marrickville RSL (now in South Sydney), Earlwood Saints (now in St George) and Christian Brothers' High School, Lewisham who now only compete in school competitions.

Some notable Newtown juniors include, Johnny Raper (Camperdown Dragons), *Ron Sigsworth & Phil Sigsworth (Newtown Hawks), Mark & Geoff Bugden (Marrickville), Grant & Craig Ellis (Marrickville RSL), Jeff Fenech (St. Pius Enmore, Marrickville RSL), Matt and Brad Burke (St. Josephs Newtown), Paul Osborne (Christian Bros Lewisham), Col Murphy (Newtown Hawks), Frank "Bumper" Farrell (Marrickville), Frank Hyde, Brian "Poppa" Clay (St Peters), Greg Pierce (Sydenham), Paul Akkary (St Peters), Michael Speechley and future Australian Prime Minister Anthony Albanese (Camperdown Dragons).

Referees
Despite being one of the smallest junior league competitions in Sydney, Newtown District Rugby League Referees Association provided a steady flow of referees to the graded ranks of the National Rugby League and the New South Wales Rugby League. Newtown Junior League was a tough, uncompromising competition so the referees quickly learned to manage difficult players and provide a controlled game.

The Newtown graded referees included: Gary Bennett, David Bowron, Lyle Buckley, Phil Cooley, Jack Danzey, Cyril Dimon, Grant Heaton, Kim Holwell, Mick Howell, Peter Lucas, Don Macdonald, Terry Murphy, Geoff Norberry, Richie Pierce and Peter Pierse.

Re-emergence
The club re-emerged in 1990 to play in the third-tier NSW competition, the Metropolitan Cup, winning the title four times (1992, 1995, 1996 and 1997). The club no longer enters a team in the NSWRL Jim Beam Cup due to it announcing in the off-season after the 2006 season of the NSWRL Jim Beam Cup that it would now only concentrate on the Premier League side. The coach during 1990, 1991 and 1992 was Brian 'Wacka' Wakefield.

In 2000, Newtown entered a team in the NSWRL Premier League, the second-tier NSW competition to the NRL. While a stand-alone club for many purposes, they have acted as a feeder for NRL teams such as South Sydney, Cronulla-Sutherland Sharks, Auckland, Sydney Roosters (until the end of the 2014 season), and as of the start of the 2015 season with the Cronulla-Sutherland Sharks.

In 2006, Newtown lost to the Parramatta Eels 20–19 in extra time in the Premier League Grand Final due to a field goal from Eels halfback Marcus Perenara after three minutes of golden point extra time.

In 2007, the club had a less fortunate season compared to 2006, failing to make the finals or even make the top 10.

On 20 August 2007, a film depicting the club, The Final Winter starring and written by former Sydney rugby league footballer Matt Nable was released in cinemas across Australia.

In 2008, Newtown again made the Grand Final of the newly formed New South Wales Cup. In an extraordinary game against the Wentworthville Magpies, the Jets scored first and led 8–4 at halftime. At full-time scores were locked at 8-8, again forcing the game into extra time, an ironic repeat of the 2006 decider. Finally after 24 minutes of extra time and dozens of attempts at field goals from both teams, captain Sean Rudder erred in kicking out on the full. This gave the Magpies good field position and allowed them to score the winning try in the corner. After the longest ever grand final match, Wentworthville won 12–8.

On 5 February 2011, Newtown played a trial game against long term rivals, the South Sydney Rabbitohs, at a revamped Redfern Oval. South Sydney won 10–4.

In 2012, Newtown just made the finals, finishing the regular season in 7th spot, but reached the Grand Final against the 8th placed Balmain Ryde-Eastwood Tigers, on their way defeating the more fancied North Sydney Bears and Canterbury-Bankstown Bulldogs. Newtown got to a 12–0 lead before Balmain came back to bring the scoreline back to 12–10 at the break. The lead changed four times in the second half before Newtown ended up winning the match 22–18. This marks the first premiership won by Newtown in the NSW Cup since 1974, breaking a 38-year drought.

On 27 August 2016, Newtown played host to Manly at Henson Park in the last regular season fixture of the year. With less than twenty minutes to play Newtown trailed Manly by 38–12. Newtown then preceded to score 5 tries in 18 minutes to win the match 40–38. This was also the last game that Manly ever played in the NSW Cup as a stand-alone team due to their merger with Blacktown Workers commencing 2017.

On 18 September 2016, Newtown played Illawarra for a place in the grand final. With under ten minutes to go, Newtown were winning until Illawarra scored two quick tries to defeat Newtown 18–10.  Illawarra went on to win their first premiership the next week.

The 2017 Intrust Super Premiership NSW season was not a good one for Newtown as they finished 11th (Second last) on the table with just six wins all year.

On 30 October 2017, it was announced that Newtown would be continuing their partnership with Cronulla for 2018, acting as the feeder club side.  On 17 May 2018, Newtown announced that they had extended their partnership as Cronulla's feeder team for a further five years.

The 2018 Intrust Super Premiership NSW season was a return to form for Newtown as the club finished 3rd on the table at the end of the regular season. In the finals series, Newtown defeated defending premiers Penrith to qualify for the grand final. In the final, Newtown led Canterbury 10-0 early on but could not hold onto their advantage and were defeated 18–12 in a close game.

At the start of the 2019 Canterbury Cup NSW season, Newtown began badly losing their first four games before recovering to finish the regular season in 7th place on the table and qualify for the finals.

Newtown would then go on to make the 2019 Canterbury Cup NSW grand final after defeating Mounties, North Sydney and minor premiers St George. In the grand final against Wentworthville, Newtown won the premiership after scoring a try in the 88th minute of extra-time at the new Western Sydney Stadium to win 20–15.

The following week in the NRL State Championship final at ANZ Stadium, Newtown player Billy Magoulias set up the winning try with just five seconds of normal time remaining. With Newtown trailing the match, Magoulias kicked over the top of the Burleigh Bears' defence and Newtown player Jackson Ferris raced away to score under the posts to give Newtown a 20–16 victory.

Newtown finished the 2022 NSW Cup season as Minor Premiers but fell one game short of the grand final losing to Canterbury 28-26. On 28 September 2022, Greg Matterson who had been the head coach of Newtown for 15 seasons announced he would be stepping down from the role.

Home grounds 
The first home ground of the Newtown football club was Metters Sports Ground in Erskineville or Alexandria on Ashmore Road, next to the owners, the Metters factory, which produced stoves and ovens. Across the road was Erskineville Oval. Generally the crowd attendance there was between several hundred and 3,000. At the season opening in April 1911, 9,000 spectators saw Newtown defeat Balmain 16–3. In those days the ground was often criticised for being too hard, like many others in Sydney, and the grandstand not being "imposing" enough.

In later years, Newtown was at home at Erskineville Oval and Marrickville Oval before the club moved to today's venue, Henson Park.

Attendances at Henson Park are the highest in the NSWRL Premier League. Their attendance is always announced as being 8,972, in reference to a game played at Henson Park in the 1990s on a wet and miserable day. The Newtown Jets ground announcer John Lynch jokingly said through the speaker that the crowd was 8,972. This figure has now become a part of Newtown folklore and is announced as the crowd at every home match.

Players

Current squad
The current squad is made up of the following:

Team of the century
In 2008, the centenary year of rugby league in Australia, the Newtown Jets club named an 18-man team of the century:

Gordon Clifford
Phil Sigsworth
Lionel Williamson
Charles Russell
Dick Poole
Len Smith
Brian Moore
Bill Farnsworth
Tony Brown
Keith Froome
Frank Farrell (c)
Paddy McCue
Paul Quinn
Arthur Folwell
Herb Narvo
Graham Wilson
Felix Ryan & Noel Mulligan
Coach: Warren Ryan

Coaching register

Honours and records

Team
Premierships (3): 1910 (drew 4-4 with Souths), 1933 (defeated St George 18-5), 1943 (defeated Norths 34-7).
Runners-up (7): 1913, 1914, 1929, 1944, 1954, 1955, 1981.
Minor premierships (6): 1910, 1933, 1943, 1944, 1954, 1955
Finals (20): (1910, 1929, 1933, 1940, 1943, 1944, 1945, 1946, 1947, 1948, 1950, 1954, 1955, 1956, 1958, 1959, 1962, 1966, 1973, 1981)

Youth Team
Reserve Grade (6): 1922, 1947, 1948, 1951, 1970, 1974
President's Cup (6): 1919, 1921, 1928, 1944, 1950, 1956
Club Championship: 1973
Preseason Competition: 1973
City Cup: 1937, 1942
State Championship: 1941, 1945, 2019
Metropolitan Cup: 1992, 1995, 1996, 1997
NSW Cup: 2012, 2019
Biggest wins:
51-0 v Illawarra at Henson Park, 2 May 1982
55-7 v St. George at SCG, 26 Aug 1944
48-3 v University at Henson Park, 12 May 1937
52-7 v St George at Sydney Cricket Ground, 3 Jun 1944
50-6 v Manly-Warringah at Sydney Cricket Ground, 13 Jun 1955
54-6 v Wentworthville at Henson Park, 11 June 2016
Biggest defeats:
65-9 v St George at Kogarah Oval, 30 Jul 1961
57-6 v Manly-Warringah at Henson Park, 16 May 1976
54-4 v Parramatta at Belmore Oval, 5 Jun 1983
50-2 v Manly-Warringah at Brookvale Oval, 14 Aug 1977
54-10 v St. George at Kogarah Oval, 24 Jul 1960
44-0 v Cronulla-Sutherland at Endeavour Field, 23 Jul 1978
62-18 v Parramatta at Henson Park, 20 Aug 1978
60-6 v Penrith at St Marys Stadium, 25 June 2016
Come from behind victories:
1926, Newtown vs Souths at the SCG. Souths hadn't lost a match in 1925 nor yet in 1926. Souths took an easy lead of 18-0 well into the second half. With Newtown down to 12 men (no replacement rule was in place) the matched looked like it would be a runaway victory. Newtown however managed to throw the ball around and ran out eventual victors by the smallest of margins, 25–24. The 'battlers' had defeated the 'invincibles'.

27 August 2016, Newtown played host to Manly at Henson Park in the last regular season fixture of the year. With less than twenty minutes to play Newtown trailed Manly by 38–12. Newtown then proceeded to score five tries in 18 minutes to win the match 40–38.

Individual

Rothmans Medal winners: Geoff Bugden (1980)
NSW Player of the Year: Len Smith (1948)
Coach of the Year: Jack Gibson (1973), Warren Ryan (1981)
Test Captains, Australia: Albert Johnston (1919–20), Len Smith (1948), Keith Froome (1949)
World Cup Captains, Australia: Dick Poole (1957)
Internationals, Australia (34): Jack Barnett, Tony Brown, Frank Cheadle, Gordon Clifford, Tedda Courtney, Bill Farnsworth, Viv Farnsworth, Frank Farrell, Arthur Folwell, Keith Froome, Col Geelan, Henry Holloway, Jack Holmes, Frank Johnson, Albert Johnston, Paddy McCue, Brian Moore, Noel Mulligan, Joe Murray, Herb Narvo, William Neill, Bill Noble, Dick Poole, Paul Quinn, Tom Raudonikis, Charlie Russell, Felix Ryan, Phil Sigsworth, Len Smith, Gary Sullivan, Dick Townsend, Jack Troy, Lionel Williamson, Graham Wilson
First brothers to play Internationals, Bill Farnsworth and Viv Farnsworth in 1911
Fred Daly Trophy winners (started in 1957 for the Best Clubman of each season): 
 1957 Maurie Hall
 1958 Peter Ryan
 1959 Kevin Considine
 1960 Greg Ellis
 1961 Brian McGoulrick
 1962 Ron Hansen
 1963 Graham Wilson
 1964 John Oakley
 1965 Clarrie Jeffries
 1966 Bruce Olive
 1967 Des O'Connor
 1968 Rob Cowie
 1969 Bob Keyes
 1970 Des O'Connor
 1971 & 1972 Lionel Williamson
 1973 Chris Kenna
 1974 Ron Fogarty
 1975 Barry Cox
 1976 Paul Hayward
 1977 & 1978 Phil Sigsworth
 1979 Ken Wilson
 1980 Mark O'Brien
 1981 Sam Fallico
 1982 Col Murphy
 1983 Greg Brown

Career records
Most tries 
111 - Ray Preston
Most points 
1,001 - Ken Wilson (25T, 447G, 28FG)
Most appearances 
204 - Frank Farrell (1938–1951)
173 - Brian Moore (1962–1973)
150 - Ken Wilson (1971–1974, 1979–1983)
142 - Tommy Nevin (1935–1945)
128 - Tom Ellis (1923–1933)
128 - Graham Wilson (1960–1967)
127 - Felix Ryan (1913–1923)
126 - Les Bull (1922–1934)
120 - Jack Davies (1928–1932, 1934–1938)
116 - Tony Brown (1956–1964)

Season records: 
Most tries: 34 - Ray Preston, 1954
Most points: 197 - Ken Wilson (5T, 90G, 2FG), 1980

Match records: 
Most tries: 6 - Jack Troy v Eastern Suburbs, 8 Jul 1950
Most goals: 11 - Tom Kirk
v St George, 3 Jun 1944
v St George, 26 Aug 1944
Most points: 25 - Tom Kirk (1T, 11G) v St George, 26 Aug 1944
First Match (in 1908 at Wentworth Park): Lost 16-32 Vs Eastern Suburbs
First Drawn Match (in 1908): 12-12 Vs Balmain (Round 3)
First Win (in 1908): Won 16-6 Vs Cumberland (Round 4)
No Score (in 1982): 0-0 (Nil all) Vs Canterbury-Banskstown, at Henson Park (first time in First Grade history no points were scored in a match)
Lowest Score Win (in 1973): 1-0 (One-Nil) Vs St. George, at SCG (first time in First Grade history only 1 point was scored in a match. Field goals were devalued to 1 point in 1971)

See also

New South Wales Rugby League premiership

References

External links

Newtown Jets at rl1908.com
Newtown stats at rleague.com
Newtown Jets Rugby League Team of Century 2008 at rugbyleaguedigest.com.au
Newtown Jerseys at newtownjetsjerseys.com

Newtown Jets
Ron Massey Cup
1908 establishments in Australia
Rugby clubs established in 1908
Rugby league teams in New South Wales